Gypothamnium is a genus of South American flowering plants in the family Asteraceae.

Species
There is only one known species, Gypothamnium pinifolium, native to the Atacama Desert of northern Chile.

References

Endemic flora of Chile
Monotypic Asteraceae genera
Onoserideae
Atacama Desert